Erik Granat (born 9 August 1995) is a Swedish footballer who plays for Gefle IF as a midfielder.

References

External links
 
  
 

1995 births
Living people
Swedish footballers
Association football midfielders
GIF Sundsvall players
Gefle IF players
Allsvenskan players
Superettan players
Ettan Fotboll players